24timer (literally 24hours) was a Danish free daily newspaper published by MetroXpress.

History and profile
24timer began distribution on 17 August 2006 and it was owned by JP/Politikens Hus.

24timer had a circulation of 395,000 copies in 2006.

Two editions of 24timer were closed in Odense and Aalborg in November 2008. The paper ceased publication on 22 March 2013 when it merged with its sister paper MetroXpress.

See also
 Dato
 MetroXpress
 Nyhedsavisen
 Urban

References

External links
 Official website 
 Jyllands-Posten article on the new free daily newspapers in Denmark 

2006 establishments in Denmark
2013 disestablishments in Denmark
Publications established in 2006
Publications disestablished in 2013
Danish-language newspapers
Defunct newspapers published in Denmark
Defunct free daily newspapers
Daily newspapers published in Denmark
Newspapers published in Copenhagen